Phaon iridipennis, commonly known as the glistening demoiselle or glinsterjuffertjie, is a species of damselfly in the family Calopterygidae.

Description 
The common name comes from its iridescent wings, which sparkle with purple-blue flecks in the sunlight. The wings become more smoky with age. Pterostigmas may or may not be present, although it is unclear what drives this difference. When present, they start off as light brown in colour and become darker with age. The thorax and abdomen are a coppery green in both sexes, although females are duller and browner than the males.

Distribution and Habitat
This species is common and widespread. It is found in most countries in sub-Saharan Africa; from South Africa to Ethiopia and Senegal, particularly in more tropical areas.  It also occurs on Madagascar.

It is most common along rivers and streams with gallery forest, but also occurs in coastal, dune and swamp forests, as well as the forested edges of pans and marshes. It is highly dependent on shade, and is rarely seen out in open sunlight. It does, however, sometimes occur in more open areas within forests.

Ecology
It  has been recorded all year round in the warmer regions, but is most active from October to March with a peak during late November. When at rest, the wings are held at a 45° angle and the abdomen is slightly raised. It is very cryptic when perched, but conspicuous in flight due to its iridescent wings and large size. When around water it perches low down on rocks and overhanging sticks. It is, however, frequently found far from water in forest undergrowth, particularly late in the season. They are normally found perched in dense, shady undergrowth, where they frequently perch on sticks and logs among the leaf litter. They usually occur within  of the ground.

Conservation 
This species is listed as being of least concern by the IUCN. It is fairly resilient to habitat change, including changing water turbidity. It can also tolerate at least some alien vegetation.

References

External links

  Phaon iridipennis Text for glistening demoiselle from South African Dragonfly Atlas
  Phaon iridipennis on African Dragonflies and Damselflies Online

Calopterygidae
Odonata of Africa
Insects described in 1839
Taxonomy articles created by Polbot